David Gold is an English bridge player.

Bridge accomplishments

Wins

 Gold Cup (4) 2012, 2013, 2014, 2019 
Premier League Winner (8) 2008, 2011, 2013, 2014, 2016, 2017, 2018, 2021
Spring Fours Winner (3) 2016, 2017, 2018
Crockfords Winner 2012

International Medals

 Bronze European Pairs Tenerife 2005
Silver World Olympiad Teams Championship (1) 2008
Silver European Teams Championships Opatija 2014
Bronze World Transnationals Lyon 2017
Bronze Champion's Cup 2018 Eilat
Silver Champions Cup Bucharest 2019

North American Bridge Championships 

 Winner of 2017 Board-A-Match
Winner of 2023 Vanderbilt
Runner Up of 2016 Board-A-Match
Runner Up of 2017 Vanderbilt
3rd 2017 Spingold
Runner up LM pairs 2015 & 2018
3rd Reisinger 2010

Notes

Year of birth missing (living people)
Living people
English contract bridge players